The Acre gubernatorial election was held on 7 October 2018 to elect the next governor of the state, 8 federal deputies and two out of its three senators. Senator Gladson Cameli won 53% of the vote in the first round, making him the elected governor of Acre without the need of a runoff. Senator Sérgio Petecão was reelected with 30% of the vote and former congressman Márcio Bittar was elected with 23% of the vote, unseating Jorge Viana, one of the incumbent senators.

The previous gubernatorial election in the state was held in October 2014. Workers' Party candidate Tião Viana was re-elected after a runoff with 51.29% of the vote, beating PSDB candidate Márcio Bittar, who got 48.71% of the vote.

Candidates for governor

Progressistas (PP)

 Gladson Cameli - Senator for Acre since 2015; Federal deputy for Acre 2007–2015.

Workers' Party (PT)

 Marcus Alexandre -Rio Branco mayor 2013–2018.

Social Liberal Party (PSL)

 Coronel Ulysses - Former military police colonel.

Avante

 David Hall - Ufac philosophy teacher.

Rede Sustentabilidade (REDE)

 Janaina Furtado - Alderwoman of Tarauacá since 2017.

Candidates for senator

Social Democratic Party (PSD)

 Sérgio Petecão - Senator for Acre since 2011; Federal deputy for Acre 2007–2011; State deputy for Acre 1995–2007.

Brazilian Democratic Movement (MDB)

 Márcio Bittar - Federal deputy for Acre 1999–2003, 2011–2015.

Workers' Party (PT)

 Jorge Viana - Rio Branco mayor 1993–1997; Governor of Acre 1999–2007; Senator for Acre since 2013.
 Ney Amorim - State deputy since 2006.

Rede Sustentabilidade (REDE)

 Minoru Kinpara - Ufac director of development of teaching.

Social Liberal Party (PSL)

 Pedrazza - Lawyer.

Debates

Results

Governor

Senator
 Elect

References

2018 Brazilian gubernatorial elections
Acre (state)
October 2018 events in South America
Acre gubernatorial elections